Stanley Chambers (13 September 1910 – 14 August 1991) was a British cyclist who competed in the 1932 Summer Olympics. Born in Hackney, London, he was the brother of Ernest Chambers. The two brothers rode together to win the silver medal in the tandem sprint event.

References

1910 births
1991 deaths
English male cyclists
Olympic cyclists of Great Britain
Cyclists at the 1932 Summer Olympics
Olympic silver medallists for Great Britain
Olympic medalists in cycling
People from Hackney Central
Medalists at the 1932 Summer Olympics